The women's long jump event at the 2015 European Athletics Indoor Championships was held on 6 March 2015 at 12:15 (qualification) and 7 March, 16:45 (final) local time.

Medalists

Records

Results

Qualification 
Qualification: Qualification Performance 6.65 (Q) or at least 8 best performers advanced to the final.

Final

References

2015 European Athletics Indoor Championships
Long jump at the European Athletics Indoor Championships
2015 in women's athletics